The 2006–07 Maltese Premier League (known as the BOV Premier League for sponsorship reasons) was the 27th season of the Maltese Premier League, and the 92nd season of top-level league football in Malta. Marsaxlokk won the title while St. George's and Marsa were relegated to the Maltese First Division.

Teams 

The following teams were promoted from the First Division at the start of the season:
 St. George's
 Marsa

From the previous Premier League season, the following teams were relegated to the First Division:
 Mosta
 Ħamrun Spartans

First round

League table

Results

Second phase

Top Six 

The teams placed in the first six positions in the league table qualified for the Top Six, and the points obtained during the first phase were halved (and rounded up) before the start of second phase. As a result, the teams started with the following points before the second phase: Marsaxlokk 23 points, Sliema Wanderers 17, Valletta 17, Msida Saint-Joseph 17, Birkirkara 15 and Hibernians 13.

Play-out 

The teams which finished in the last four league positions were placed in the play-out and at the end of the phase the two lowest-placed teams were relegated to the First Division. The points obtained during the first phase were halved (and rounded up) before the start of second phase. As a result, the teams started with the following points before the second phase: Floriana 12 points, St. George's 6, Pietà Hotspurs 5, Marsa 2.

Season statistics

Top scorers

Hat-tricks

Awards

Monthly awards

References

External links 
 Official website

Maltese Premier League seasons
Malta
1